Miedzianka may refer to the following places in Poland:
Miedzianka, Lower Silesian Voivodeship (south-west Poland)
Miedzianka, Świętokrzyskie Voivodeship (south-central Poland)